"The Fable of the Dragon-Tyrant" is a 2005 short story about ageing and death by the Swedish philosopher Nick Bostrom. It relates the misery inflicted by a dragon-tyrant (a personification of the ageing process and death), who demands a tribute of thousands of people's lives per day and the actions of the people, including the king, who come together to fight back, eventually killing the dragon-tyrant.

Arguments 
The story argues that humans for most of history have lacked the tools to fight the monster of death, but now the capacity to fight it may exist. The fable thus addresses the themes of death acceptance and resignation to fate in the face of ageing and critiques the pro-aging trance.

Publication history 
The story has been published in Philosophy Now, and the Journal of Medical Ethics.

It has been translated into multiple languages, including Chinese, Czech, Dutch, Finnish, French, German, Hebrew, Italian, Polish, Russian, Serbian, Slovak, Slovenian and Spanish.

In popular culture 
The YouTuber CGP Grey produced an animated adaptation in 2018; it was highly praised by the Life Extension Advocacy Foundation.

References

External links 
 The Fable of the Dragon-Tyrant
  by CGP Grey

Ageing in fiction
Fables
Fictional dragons
Fictional personifications of death
Parables
Monarchy in fiction
Philosophical fiction
Transhumanism in fiction
Short stories adapted into films
Works adapted into animated films